Roza Anagnosti (born 27 October 1943) is an Albanian film and stage actress, and the wife of director Dhimitër Anagnosti. She is known for Fijet që priten (1976), Mësonjëtorja (1980) and Detyrë e posaçme (1963).

Life and career 
Anagnosti started her career at the Migjeni Theater in Shkodra. At 20, she became a movie actress with the role of a teacher in the film Special Duty (K. Dhamo, 1963). A year later she played the role of File in Our Land (H. Hakani, 1964). In 1966 she worked in the film debut of filmmakers Dhimiter Anagnosti and Viktor Gjika, in The Commissar of Light. After this film, Roza and Dhimitri married and lived in Tirana. This was the beginning of an important period in her career, with numerous roles at the National Theater in Tirana and in film. Anagnosti played in over 20 films including Old Wounds (Anagnosti, 1969), The Waiting Thread (M. Fejzo, 1976) for which she won the 1977 Medal of the Festival, Mesonjetorja (M. Fejzo, 1979), where she won best actress and the 1981 Festival Cup. With the film The Way of Freedom she won the Second Medal. Other films include The Deal 1972, The Youngest City in the World 1974, In Our Home 1979, First Appointment Day 1981, Red Besa 1982, Taulanti Wants a Sister 1984, 1985, The Invisible World 1987, My Family 1987, Murder on Hunting 1987, Reconstruction 1988, The Return of the Dead Army 1989, The Only 1990. Anagnosti holds the title Deserved Artist and Great Worker Masters.

Filmography
 Gjoleka, djali i Abazit (2006)
 Valsi i Titanikut (1990) teater-komedi
 Vetmi (1990), Bardha
 Kthimi i Ushtrisë së Vdekur (1989)
 Rikonstruksioni (1988) (TV)
 Botë e padukshme (1987).....doktoreshë Besmira
 Familja ime (1987)
 Vrasje ne gjueti (1987)
 Gurët e shtëpisë sime (1985)
 Taulanti kërkon një motër (1984), Luli
 Besa e kuqe (1982)  - Mrika
 Rruga e lirisë (1982)
 Dita e parë e emrimit (1981)
 Mësonjtorja (1979)..........Dafina
 Në shtëpinë tonë (1979)
 Fije që priten (1976)
 Qyteti më i ri në botë (1974)
 Ndërgjegja (1972)...........Arta
 Plagë të vjetra (1968)......Vera
 Komisari i dritës (1966)....Rudina
 Toka jonë (1964) .... Filja
 Detyrë e posaçme (1963)

References

External links 

1943 births
Living people
Albanian actresses